American IronHorse was an American motorcycle manufacturer based in the Dallas-Fort Worth, Texas area that was founded in 1995 by Tim Edmondson and Bill Rucker. At one time, AIH was the largest factory producer of custom motorcycles in the USA. Their  factory was located in Fort Worth, Texas, and housed the complete manufacturing process under a single roof. Although most (305) parts for the bikes were made in-house, such as the seats and wheels, all American IronHorse motorcycles were built with S&S engines and were assembled in-house. By 2006, the company had sold around 10,000 motorcycles. In Spring 2008, American Ironhorse ceased production on all motorcycles and most company assets were liquidated at auction.

Following Bill Rucker's departure, AIH had a succession of CEOs and Tim Edmondson, President, the second largest shareholder and director of design sold his ownership in the company the following year. In 2005, negotiated a $40 million deal with Textron Inc. Buck Hendricson, who oversaw the company's second bankruptcy, also guided the firm through its sale to Textron Inc, which subsequently liquidated the company in 2008.  

The Company specialized in making motorcycles that had large displacement V-twin engines with large fins.  One reviewer suggested the products are eye candy and beautiful, more powerful than comparable Harley Davidsons, but lacking in handling and amenities.

Models

Roadster

10th Anniversary Texas Chopper
Bandit
Classic
Roadster
SR Roadster
Stalker
Thunder
XR Thunder
YR Classic
ZR Slammer
Texas Chopper-Softtail
Legend-Softtail
Slammer-Adjustable Air Ride, named 2007 Bike of the Year by V-twin magazine
LSC-Lone Star Chopper "Rigid
Tejas-Rigid
Outlaw-Softail
Bandera-Softail
Classic Chop-Softail
Judge-Softail
Ironhorse Ranger
Ironhorse Bagger

References

External links
Manuals Brands: AMERICAN IRONHORSE Manuals Motorcycle Legend SC Owner's manual AMERICAN IRONHORSE Legend SC Owner's Manual
American IronHorser VIN system

Defunct motorcycle manufacturers of the United States
Motorcycles by brand
Motorcycles introduced in the 1990s
Companies based in Fort Worth, Texas
Vehicle manufacturing companies established in 1995